Montréal/Marina Venise Water Airport, formerly , was located on the Rivière des Mille Îles near Montreal, Quebec, Canada and was open from May until the middle of November. It was classified as an airport by Nav Canada and subject to regular inspections by Transport Canada.

See also
 List of airports in the Montreal area

References

Certified airports in Quebec
Defunct seaplane bases in Quebec